The Women's Downhill competition of the Nagano 1998 Olympics was held at Happo-One at Hakuba on Monday, February 16. The race was delayed two days due to rain and fog.

The defending world champion was Hilary Lindh of the United States, while Austria's Renate Goetschl was the defending World Cup downhill champion.

Katja Seizinger successfully defended her Olympic title, Pernilla Wiberg took the silver, and Florence Masnada was the bronze medalist. Through 2019, Seizinger remains the only ski racer in history to repeat as an Olympic downhill gold medalist.

Seizinger's winning time was 88.89 seconds, yielding an average course speed of 

Results
The race was started at 10:30 local time, (UTC +9).

References 

Women's downhill
Olymp
Women's events at the 1998 Winter Olympics